Žoržs Tikmers (born 22 January 1957 in Iecava, Latvian SSR) is a Latvian sports executive and former rower who competed for the Soviet Union in the 1980 Summer Olympics.

In 1980 he was a crew member of the Soviet boat which won the silver medal in the coxed fours event.

From 1992 to 2012, he was the vice president of the Latvian Olympic Committee (LOC). From 2012 to 2020, he was the Secretary General of LOC. In 2020 he became the president of the Latvian Olympic Committee.

References

External links
 
 

1957 births
Living people
People from Iecava
Latvian male rowers
Soviet male rowers
Olympic rowers of the Soviet Union
Rowers at the 1980 Summer Olympics
Olympic silver medalists for the Soviet Union
Olympic medalists in rowing
Medalists at the 1980 Summer Olympics
World Rowing Championships medalists for the Soviet Union
Latvian Academy of Sport Education alumni
Latvian sports executives and administrators